The 1977 Australian Professional Championship was a professional non-ranking snooker tournament, which took place in September 1977.

Eddie Charlton won the tournament defeating Paddy Morgan 25–21 in the final.

Main draw

References

Australian Professional Championship
1977 in snooker
1977 in Australian sport